Halimione portulacoides, commonly known as sea purslane, is a shrub found in Eurasia.

Description 
It is evergreen, and in northern temperate climates it flowers from July to September. The flowers are monoecious and are pollinated by wind.

Taxonomy 
Botanical synonyms include Atriplex portulacoides L. and Obione portulacoides (L.) Moq. Recent phylogenetic research revealed that Halimione is a distinct genus and cannot be included in Atriplex.

Distribution and habitat 
Halimione portulacoides occurs at the sea shores of western and southern Europe, and from the Mediterranean Sea to western Asia. A halophyte, it is found in salt marshes and coastal dunes, and is usually flooded at high tide.

Ireland 
Copeland Islands (Co. Down).

Uses 
The edible leaves can be eaten raw in salads or cooked as a potherb. They are thick and succulent with a crunchy texture and a natural saltiness. The leaves are good for human and animal health as they contain important micronutrients like zinc, iron, copper, and cobalt.

References

External links 
 

Chenopodioideae
Flora of Europe
Flora of Western Asia
Flora of North Africa
Plants described in 1753
Taxa named by Carl Linnaeus
Leaf vegetables